Lan Chunlei (born 1989) is a Chinese team handball player. She plays on the Chinese national team, and participated at the 2011 World Women's Handball Championship in Brazil.

References

1989 births
Living people
Chinese female handball players